The 1988 Vermont gubernatorial election took place on November 8, 1988. Incumbent Democrat Madeleine Kunin ran successfully for re-election to a third term as Governor of Vermont, defeating Republican candidate Michael Bernhardt.

Democratic primary

Results

Republican primary

Results

Liberty Union primary

Results

General election

Polling

Results

See also
 1988 United States House of Representatives election in Vermont
 1988 United States presidential election in Vermont
 1988 United States Senate election in Vermont

References

Vermont
1988
Gubernatorial